José María Amo Torres (born 9 April 1998) is a Spanish professional footballer who plays for SD Ponferradina as a central defender.

Club career

Sevilla
Born in Las Pajanosas, Seville, Andalusia, Amo joined Sevilla FC's youth setup in 2006, aged eight; originally a central midfielder, he subsequently changed to a central defender. On 4 October 2015, aged only 17, he made his senior debut for the reserves by starting in a 1–1 away draw against Marbella FC in the Segunda División B. Late in the year, British newspaper The Guardian named him as one of the fifty most talented youth soccer players in the world.

Amo contributed with six appearances during the campaign, as Sevilla Atlético achieved promotion to Segunda División. On 15 June 2016, despite having suffered a partially torn anterior cruciate ligament on the right knee, he renewed his contract until 2019.

On 21 February 2017, Amo scored two spot-kicks for nine-men Sevilla under-19s in the Round of 16 of the 2016–17 UEFA Youth League, giving his side the lead before they ultimately lost 2–3. Amo made his professional debut with the B-team on 19 March, coming on as a late substitute for Marc Gual in a 2–1 away win against Real Zaragoza; after Fabrice Ondoa was sent off, he featured as the club's goalkeeper for the last minutes, keeping a clean sheet.

Amo tore his meniscus and once again suffered cruciate ligament damage on his right knee on 10 December 2017, being sidelined for seven months. Despite being injured, Amo was nominated for the 2018 Golden Boy.

With the B-team down to eight men, Amo scored his first senior goal on 23 February 2019, netting the winning penalty in the 85 minute of a 2–1 away win against Club Recreativo Granada. On 7 May, after contributing with 26 matches during the campaign, he renewed his contract with the Nervionenses for one more season; ahead of the 2019–20 season, he was named team captain.

Ponferradina
On 6 August 2020, free agent Amo signed for SD Ponferradina in the second division. He scored his first professional goal on 11 January of the following year, netting the equalizer in a 1–1 home draw against Girona FC.

Personal life
The son of a mayor, Amo would have become a bullfighter had he not become a footballer.

References

External links
 
 
 

1998 births
Living people
People from Sierra Norte (Seville)
Sportspeople from the Province of Seville
Spanish footballers
Footballers from Andalusia
Association football defenders
Segunda División players
Segunda División B players
Sevilla Atlético players
SD Ponferradina players
Spain youth international footballers
Spain under-21 international footballers